Antianthe is a genus of treehoppers in the family Membracidae. There are about seven described species in Antianthe.

Species
These seven species belong to the genus Antianthe:
 Antianthe atromarginata Goding
 Antianthe boliviana Metcalf
 Antianthe chichiana Funkhouser
 Antianthe expansa (Germar, 1835) (keeled tree hopper)
 Antianthe foliacea Stål
 Antianthe reversa Walker
 Antianthe viridissima Walker

References

Further reading

External links

 

Smiliinae
Auchenorrhyncha genera
Articles created by Qbugbot